Voncarie Owens is a running back for Team Michigan of the All American Football League.  Owens was signed by the Rams as an undrafted rookie free agent on April 30, 2007 after four years as a collegiate player at Ohio University.

Early life
A three-sport athlete, Owens also lettered in track and baseball. In football, he led Collins High School to back-to-back state titles in 2002 and 2003. He received all-state and all-region honors during his senior season.

College career

Jones County
Owens attended Jones County Junior College in Ellisville, Mississippi.  While there, he was a preseason All-America selection and earned all-state and all-region honors prior to transferring to Ohio.

Ohio
In his senior season with the Ohio Bobcats, Owens played in 13 games on special teams and as a reserve running back. He was the team's third-leading rusher with 161 yards on 43 carries, running for two touchdowns. He had a season-high 12 carries for 44 yards and a touchdown against Buffalo. Also during his senior season, Owens helped lead the Bobcats to a MAC East Division title, a MAC Championship Game appearance, and a 2007 GMAC Bowl appearance.

External links
Rams team roster
Owens signs with the Rams

1985 births
American football running backs
St. Louis Rams players
Living people
Jones County Bobcats football players
Ohio Bobcats football players
Ohio University alumni
San Angelo Stampede Express players
People from Taylorsville, Mississippi